A grove is a small group of trees with minimal or no undergrowth, such as a sequoia grove, or a small orchard planted for the cultivation of fruits or nuts. Other words for groups of trees include woodland, woodlot, thicket, and stand.

The main meaning of "grove" is a group of trees that grow close together, generally without many bushes or other plants underneath. It is an old word in the English language, with records of its use dating as far back as the late 9th century. The word's true origins are unknown; the word, or a related root, cannot be found in any other Germanic language.

Naturally-occurring groves are typically small, perhaps a few acres at most.  In contrast, orchards, which are normally intentional planting of trees, may be small or very large, like the apple orchards in Washington state, and orange groves in Florida.

Historically, groves were considered sacred in pagan, pre-Christian Germanic and Celtic cultures. Helen F. Leslie-Jacobsen argues that "we can assume that sacred groves actually existed due to repeated mentions in historiographical and ethnographical accounts. e.g. Tacitus, Germania."

See also 

 Brush arbour revival
 Bosquet is an artificial grove in a French formal garden
 List of giant sequoia groves
 The National Grove of State Trees at the United States National Arboretum
 Sacred grove
 Sacred trees and groves in Germanic paganism and mythology

References

Further reading 
 

Trees
Sacred groves